General Avia is the Italian aircraft manufacturing company which produced Stelio Frati's prototype designs as well as commercial production of some designs.

Today the official name is "GeneralAvia Aerospace Technology Company"

Aircraft
 Procaer Picchio
 Vulcanair Canguro
 General Avia Jet Condor
 General Avia F.22

See also

List of Italian companies

References

Aircraft manufacturers of Italy